Westland Township is one of the nineteen townships of Guernsey County, Ohio, United States. As of the 2010 census the population was 2,073, up from 1,931 at the 2000 census.

Geography
Located in the southwestern part of the county, it borders the following townships:
Adams Township - north
Cambridge Township - northeast
Jackson Township - east
Spencer Township - southeast
Rich Hill Township, Muskingum County - southwest
Union Township, Muskingum County - west
Highland Township, Muskingum County - northwest corner

No municipalities are located in Westland Township.

Name and history
Westland Township was established in 1810. It is the only Westland Township statewide.

Government
The township is governed by a three-member board of trustees, who are elected in November of odd-numbered years to a four-year term beginning on the following January 1. Two are elected in the year after the presidential election and one is elected in the year before it. There is also an elected township fiscal officer, who serves a four-year term beginning on April 1 of the year after the election, which is held in November of the year before the presidential election. Vacancies in the fiscal officership or on the board of trustees are filled by the remaining trustees.

References

External links
County website

Townships in Guernsey County, Ohio
Townships in Ohio